Alejandro Fabbri (born 27 October 1982) is an Argentine tennis coach and former professional tennis player.

Fabbri was born in Rufino, a small city in Santa Fe, where he grew up playing in the same age group as Guillermo Coria, also a native of Rufino. Turning professional in 2001, he reached a career high singles ranking of 328 in the world, which he attained in 2004. He made his only ATP Tour main draw in 2007 at the Croatia Open Umag, partnering Carlos Berlocq to the quarter-finals of the doubles. His biggest title win was also in doubles, at the 2008 Asunción Challenger. He won a further 21 doubles titles at ITF Futures level, as well as seven Futures titles in singles.

Since retiring from professional tennis he has worked as a tennis coach and in 2021 he joined the coaching team of Diego Schwartzman, assisting Juan Ignacio Chela. He was the coach of Hugo Dellien when the Bolivian broke through for his first Challenger title in 2018 and before that was the coach of Víctor Estrella Burgos.

Challenger/Futures titles

Singles

Doubles

References

External links
 
 

1982 births
Living people
Argentine male tennis players
Argentine tennis coaches
Sportspeople from Santa Fe Province
People from General López Department
21st-century Argentine people